The Länderpokal (English: States Cup) is the oldest cup competition of the German Football Association. It came into existence as the Kronprinzenpokal (English:Crown Prince Cup) but has changed its name various times since. The cup is held annually at the Sportschule Duisburg-Wedau. Contestants in the cup are teams of the 21 regional football associations, composed of youth players from that area. Also guest teams are invited each year since 2005, which play in the competition but will not be awarded a place in the final standings.

In the past, the cup was contested by senior regional selections, later by senior amateur selections from the Amateur-Oberligas and below. In the mid-1990s, this was changed to Under-21 selections. In 1981 the a women's competition was introduced. Record titleholder for the men's competition is the Bavarian football association.

History

The competition was formed in 1908, when the German Crown Prince William donated a cup to the German Football Association - DFB, to initiate the Kronprinzenpokal. His only condition for the new competition was that the final was always to be played in Berlin.

The trophy had an inscription engraved which it still bears today:

The Kronprinzenpokal was initially contested by only seven teams, the selections of the seven regional German football associations, North, South, West, Brandenburg, Central, South East and Baltic.

With the end of the First World War, the name of the competition was altered to reflect the fact, that Germany was not a monarchy anymore. The trophy donated by William with its inscription is however still used and handed to the winner each season.

Winners

Kronprinzenpokal
Held from 1909 to 1918, when the monarchy in Germany was abolished, the Crown Prince Cup was the first version of the tournament. It was contested between the selections of the seven regional football associations in Germany at the time. The competition was interrupted by the First World War and was not held in 1915 and 1916:

Bundespokal
The competition continued in its previous form after the end of the monarchy, in the new German Republic, now renamed Federal Cup:

Reichsbundpokal
In 1933, with the rise of the Nazis to power, the old regional football federations were abolished, football in Germany was centralized and the Gauligas were introduced, 16 regional first divisions. A new competition to replace the Bundespokal was introduced in 1935, now contested by selections from the Gaue, the new administrative subdivisions of Germany. This competition lasted until 1942, when the consequences caused by the Second World War made football more and more difficult.

Länderpokal
Staged for the first and only time after the Second World War, the State Cup was played in 1950 and won by Bavaria.

Amateur-Länderpokal
From 1951 onwards, the competition, now renamed Amateur State Cup, was open only to non-professional players. It started out with the selections of the fifteen regional football federations in West Germany, not including East German or Saarland selections, the later entering a team from 1957. Selections from the five East German federations only started to participate after the German reunion. The now twenty-one regional football federations are not always identical in size to the current sixteen German federal states; a number of states have more than one federation. 

Since 2005, a final is not played anymore and the competitions winner is determined by a group stage.

 1 North Baden declared the winner because Lower Rhine was unable to field a team for the rematch.

Competitors

1950 onwards
The selections of the twenty-one regional German football federations take part in the cup, these being:
 Bavaria (Bayern), covering the state of Bavaria
 Berlin, covering the city state of Berlin +
 Brandenburg, covering the state of Brandenburg +
 Bremen, covering the city state of Bremen
 Hamburg covering the city state of Hamburg
 Hesse (Hessen), covering the state of Hesse
 Lower Rhine (Niederrhein), covering the north western part of the state of North Rhine-Westphalia
 Lower Saxony (Niedersachsen), covering the state of Lower Saxony
 Mecklenburg-Vorpommern, covering the state of Mecklenburg-Vorpommern +
 Middle Rhine (Mittelrhein), covering the south western part of the state of North Rhine-Westphalia
 North Baden (Nordbaden), covering the north western part of the state of Baden-Württemberg
 Rhineland (Rheinland), covering the northern half of Rhineland-Palatinate
 Saarland, covering the state of Saarland
 Saxony (Sachsen), covering the state of Saxony +
 Saxony-Anhalt (Sachsen-Anhalt), covering the state of Saxony-Anhalt +
 Schleswig-Holstein, covering the state of Schleswig-Holstein
 South Baden (Südbaden), covering the south western part of the state of Baden-Württemberg
 South West (Südwest), covering the southern half of Rhineland-Palatinate
 Thuringia (Thüringen), covering the state of Thuringia +
 Westphalia (Westfalen), covering the eastern part of the state of North Rhine-Westphalia
 Württemberg, covering the eastern part of the state of Baden-Württemberg, divided into north and south in the first edition in 1951.
  + Formerly part of East Germany, except Berlin, which was divided between East and West. 
  German names in brackets, when different from English name.

References

Sources
 kicker Allmanach 1990,  by kicker, page 216 & 225 – Der Länderpokal  der Amateure (German Amateur State Cup)

External links
 Official website (in German)
 Detailed article about the competition at Spiegel Online (in German)

Football cup competitions in Germany
Recurring sporting events established in 1908
1908 establishments in Germany